Elizabeth Sparks Adams (December 12, 1911 – 2007) was an American historian. She served for 54 years on the Michigan Historical Commission, making her the  longest-serving  public official  in Michigan  history, and the first woman president of the Commission.

Biography 
Adams was born on December 12, 1911 in Romeo, Michigan. She later graduated from Pontiac High School at 19, and four years later graduated from Eastern Michigan University. She graduated with an M.A. from the University of Michigan the following year. She was the first curator of the Michigan Historical Collections from 1938 to 1939. In 1936, she married Donald E. Adams. Adams was elected a Justice of the Peace in Waterford seven years after marrying Donald Adams, and in 1954 was elected to the Waterford Township Board of Education for two terms, later serving as president of the board for two years. She served on the Michigan Historical Commission for 54 years after her appointment by Murray Van Wagoner on March 20, 1941. During her service there, she was president for fourteen years and vice president for two years, serving until stepping down in 1995. Adams was president of Historical Society of Michigan and the Oakland County Pioneer and Historical Society.

Publications
 Out of Small Beginnings, a Bicentennial Historical Sketch of Oakland County, MI, 1815-1976
Contributed to 
 Encyclopedia Britannica
 Biographical Directory of the Governors of the United States
 The University of Michigan, an Encyclopedic Survey.

References 

1911 births
2007 deaths
20th-century American historians
Eastern Michigan University alumni
University of Michigan alumni
American women historians
20th-century American women writers
20th-century American non-fiction writers
History of Michigan
People from Romeo, Michigan
Historians from Michigan
21st-century American women writers